The 1972 Gator Bowl was held on December 30, 1972, at the Gator Bowl in Jacksonville, Florida.  The sixth-ranked Auburn Tigers defeated the 13th-ranked Colorado Buffaloes by a score of 24–3.

Game summary
The scoring was opened in the second quarter by Auburn, as they converted a 27-yard field goal to take a 3–0 lead. They extended their lead to ten as they found the end zone later in the same quarter off of a 1-yard run. They took a 10–0 lead into halftime. They controlled the third quarter as well, scoring on a 22-yard pass to take a 17–0 lead into the fourth quarter. The Tigers lost their shutout when the Buffaloes hit a 33-yard field goal, but Auburn quickly responded, scoring a 16-yard touchdown pass to make the score 24–3. The game finished with the same score.

Aftermath
6th-ranked Auburn rose to #5 following their win; #13 Colorado fell to #16.

References

Gator Bowl
Gator Bowl
Auburn Tigers football bowl games
Colorado Buffaloes football bowl games
December 1972 sports events in the United States
Gator Bowl